Hypodermin C (Hypoderma collagenase) is an enzyme. This enzyme catalyses the following chemical reaction

 Hydrolysis of proteins including native collagen at -Ala bond leaving an N-terminal (75%) and a C-terminal (25%) fragment

This enzyme is isolated from the larva of a warble fly, Hypoderma lineatum.

References

External links 
 

EC 3.4.21